Waqar (وقار waqār) is a name used by Muslim men in South Asia. Derived from Arabic, it means "dignity" or "honor". People named Waqar include:

 Waqar shahid , Science teacher,Aims

Science Teacher of School Since 2008
Born in Sarghoda on 21 August 1987
He teach Physics,Chemistry , Cmoputer Science , Biology

References

Waqar Rasheed Chishti is media management ( OFFICER )Worked in different GOVERNMENT & Private Department Date of Birth 1972.Pakistani

Pakistani masculine given names